The 2018 Men's World Floorball Championships were the 12th World Championships in men's floorball. The tournament took place in Prague, Czech Republic, from 1 to 9 December 2018.

WFC 2018 Qualification 

33 teams have registered for the 12th IFF Men’s World Floorball Championships, only 16 of them to reach the final group consisted of 16 teams. Host country, Czech Republic, qualifies automatically. 

In Europe, there were four qualification groups with three event locations – Tallinn (Estonia), Nitra (Slovakia) and Valmiera (Latvia). The Asia-Oceania group tournament took place in Jeju Island, South Korea. It was the first IFF event hosted by Korea. USA and Canada played their qualification in Toronto, Canada.

Venues

Tournament groups 
After the group ballot, 16 teams are divided into 4 groups. In the group stage each team plays each other once, while the second stage of the event includes play-offs and placement matches.

The two best teams of group A and B go directly to the quarter-final. Teams placed 3rd and 4th in group A and B and the teams placed 1st and 2nd in group C and D make it to the first playoff round (played before the quarter-finals).

Results
All times are local (UTC+1).

Preliminary round

Group A

Group B

Group C

Group D

Knock-out stage

Play-off

Quarterfinals

Semifinals

Bronze medal game

Final

Placement matches

5th place bracket

5–8th place semifinals

5th place match

7th place match

9th place bracket

13th place bracket

Ranking and statistics

Final ranking
The official IFF final ranking of the tournament:

All-star team
Tournament all-star team:
Best goalkeeper:  Pascal Meier
Best defenders:  Emil Johansson,  Robin Nilsberth
Best center:  Joonas Pylsy
Best forwards:  Adam Delong,  Kim Nilsson

Most valuable player:  Pascal Meier

References

External links
Tournament webpage

2018 Men's
2018 in floorball
International floorball competitions hosted by the Czech Republic
2018 in Czech sport
December 2018 sports events in Europe
Sports competitions in Prague
2010s in Prague